Sphingulini is a tribe of moths of the family Sphingidae. The tribe was described by Walter Rothschild and Karl Jordan in 1903.

Taxonomy 
Genus Coenotes Rothschild & Jordan, 1903
Genus Dolbina Staudinger, 1877
Genus Hopliocnema Rothschild & Jordan, 1903
Genus Kentrochrysalis Staudinger, 1887
Genus Monarda Druce, 1896
Genus Pentateucha Swinhoe, 1908
Genus Sphingulus Staudinger, 1887
Genus Synoecha Rothschild & Jordan, 1903
Genus Tetrachroa Rothschild & Jordan, 1903

References

 
Smerinthinae
Taxa named by Walter Rothschild
Taxa named by Karl Jordan